Upper Hutt Central is the commercial and geographic focal point of Upper Hutt city, located in the lower North Island of New Zealand.

The area is served by Upper Hutt Railway Station.

Economy

The main shopping street is Main St.

It includes The Mall Upper Hutt, a shopping centre with 44 shops including The Warehouse, Farmers, and Monterey Cinemas.

Demographics

Upper Hutt Central had a population of 615 at the 2018 New Zealand census, an increase of 102 people (19.9%) since the 2013 census, and an increase of 198 people (47.5%) since the 2006 census. There were 213 households. There were 321 males and 294 females, giving a sex ratio of 1.09 males per female. The median age was 39.4 years (compared with 37.4 years nationally), with 108 people (17.6%) aged under 15 years, 123 (20.0%) aged 15 to 29, 318 (51.7%) aged 30 to 64, and 66 (10.7%) aged 65 or older.

Ethnicities were 80.0% European/Pākehā, 10.2% Māori, 6.3% Pacific peoples, 13.2% Asian, and 2.9% other ethnicities (totals add to more than 100% since people could identify with multiple ethnicities).

The proportion of people born overseas was 27.3%, compared with 27.1% nationally.

Although some people objected to giving their religion, 44.9% had no religion, 44.9% were Christian, 2.0% were Hindu, 1.0% were Muslim and 3.9% had other religions.

Of those at least 15 years old, 93 (18.3%) people had a bachelor or higher degree, and 78 (15.4%) people had no formal qualifications. The median income was $41,700, compared with $31,800 nationally. The employment status of those at least 15 was that 300 (59.2%) people were employed full-time, 75 (14.8%) were part-time, and 24 (4.7%) were unemployed.

Education

The school celebrated its centenary in 2010 although the school opened to support an orphanage which was established in 1911.

References

Suburbs of Upper Hutt
Central business districts in New Zealand